Corona Station or Corona station may refer to:

 Corona Station (pastoral lease), a pastoral lease in Australia
 Corona station (Edmonton), a light rail transit station in Canada
 Corona station (LIRR), a station stop on the Long Island Rail Road in the United States

See also

 
 Corona (disambiguation)